Alex Foster (born May 10, 1953) is an American jazz musician who plays alto and tenor saxophone. He has recorded for record labels since the early 1970s. He is known for playing alto sax in the Saturday Night Live house band. He is also the co-musical director for the Mingus Big Band (which was nominated for a Grammy Award in 2005, and later winning the award for Best Large Jazz Ensemble), Mingus Orchestra and Mingus Dynasty.

Discography
 1975: Cosmic Chicken (Prestige) with Jack DeJohnette's Directions
 1976: Untitled (ECM) with Jack DeJohnette's Directions
 1977: New Rags (ECM) with Jack DeJohnette's Directions
 1977: Transaxdrum (Finite)
1978: Headin' Home (A&M/Horizon) with Jimmy Owens
 1991: Beginnings: Goodbye  (Big World)
 1995: The News (Jazzline)  with Kirk Lightsey, Tony Lakatos, George Mraz
 1997: Pool of Dreams (Truspace) with Michael Wolff

Collaborations 
 Sally Can't Dance - Lou Reed (1974)
 I'll Keep On Loving You - Linda Clifford (1982)
 Graceland - Paul Simon (1986)
 The Hunger - Michael Bolton (1987)
 It's Like This - Rickie Lee Jones (2000)
 Prism - Katy Perry (2013)

References

External links
 

American jazz saxophonists
American male saxophonists
Avant-garde jazz saxophonists
Jazz musicians from California
Musicians from Oakland, California
1953 births
Living people
Grammy Award winners
Saturday Night Live Band members
21st-century American saxophonists
21st-century American male musicians
American male jazz musicians
Mingus Big Band members